The Androscoggin (Arosaguntacook, etc., see names) were an Abenaki people from what are now the U.S. states of Maine and New Hampshire. By the 18th century, they were absorbed by neighboring tribes.

Name 
Arosaguntacook or Arossagunticook, the tribe's endonym, in the eastern Abenaki language means "Rocky Flats flow" or "a river of rocks refuge."  Other recorded variations of the name are Amariscoggin, Ameriscoggin, Arsigantegok, Asschincantecook, and Alessikantek-eyak by the Penobscot and the Cowasuck.  The name Arosaguntacook was probably changed by Massachusetts Governor Edmund Andros to Androscoggin. Today's Penobscot name for the Saint Francis Abenaki is Alessikantek-eyak because Arosaguntacook belonged to the ancestors of the people of Saint Francis.

Distribution 
The Arosaguntacook once lived in the Androscoggin River watershed, located in present-day southern Maine and northern New Hampshire. Their main village was located in the vicinity of present-day Lewiston, Maine. Together with the Pigwacket, they formed the southernmost of the Abenaki tribes and were therefore one of the first in contact with the English colonists of New England.

History 
In 1675, the Androscoggin took part in King Philip's War. Metallak was a member of the Androscoggin tribe.

Maps
Maps showing the approximate locations of areas occupied by members of the Wabanaki Confederacy (from north to south):

See also
 List of Native American peoples in the United States

References
 Bruce G. Trigger (ed.): Handbook of North American Indians. Vol. 15. Northeast. Smithsonian Institution Press, Washington D.C. 1978

Further reading
 Starbird, Charles M. The Indians of the Androscoggin Valley: Tribal History, and their Relations with the Early English Settlers of Maine (1928). University of Southern Maine Digital Commons.

External links
 Abenaki History
 Abenaki Council of Odanak

Abenaki
Extinct Native American tribes
Native American history of Maine
Native American history of New Hampshire
Native American tribes in Maine
Native American tribes in New Hampshire